A radius gauge, also known as a fillet gauge, is a tool used to measure the radius of an object.

Radius gauges require a bright light behind the object to be measured.  The gauge is placed against the edge to be checked and any light leakage between the blade and edge indicates a mismatch that requires correction.

A good set of gauges will offer both convex and concave sections, and allow for their application in awkward locations.

Every leaf has a different radius, for example with radius intervals of 0.25 mm or 0.5 mm. The material of the leaves is stainless steel. Each gauge is one of two types; either internal or external, which are used to check the radius of inner and outer surfaces, respectively.

See also 
 Thread pitch gauge
 Spherometer, an instrument for the precise measurement of radiuses

References

Notes

Bibliography
.
.

Dimensional instruments
Metalworking measuring instruments